The 2012–13 Serie A season was the 79th season of the Serie A, the top level of ice hockey in Italy. 10 teams participated in the league, and Asiago Hockey won the championship. SG Pontebba was relegated to the Serie A2.

First round

Second round

Group A

Group B

Playoffs

Playouts 
 SHC Fassa - SG Pontebba 4:0 (7:1, 2:0, 2:1, 4:2)

External links 
 Lega Italiana Hockey Ghiaccio website

Serie A
Serie A (ice hockey) seasons
Ita